Corimelaena incognita is a species of ebony bug in the family Thyreocoridae. It is found in Central America and North America.

References

External links

 

Shield bugs
Articles created by Qbugbot
Insects described in 1933